The 1994 United States Senate election in Michigan was held November 8, 1994. Incumbent Democratic U.S. Senator Don Riegle decided to retire and not run for re-election. Republican Spencer Abraham won the open seat, becoming the first Republican to win a U.S. Senate race in Michigan since 1972 and the first Republican gain of the Class I Senate seat from Charles E. Potter since 1952 . , this was the last time the Republicans won a U.S. Senate election in Michigan.

Background 
Riegle, a three term incumbent, was considered one of the most vulnerable Senate Democrats in the 1994 mid-term elections, due to the unpopularity of President Bill Clinton and his being involved as a member of the Keating Five, a group of five United States Senators who were accused of corruption. After months of speculation, Riegle announced he would not seek a 4th term in a speech on the Senate floor.

Democratic primary

Candidates
William Brodhead, former U.S. Representative from Detroit
Bob Carr, U.S. Representative from East Lansing
Joel Ferguson, businessman and member of the Democratic National Committee
John F. Kelly, State Senator from Grosse Pointe Woods
Carl Marlinga, Macomb County Prosecuting Attorney
Lana Pollack, State Senator from Ann Arbor

Declined
Donald W. Riegle, incumbent Senator since 1977

Results

Republican primary

Candidates
 Spencer Abraham, former chairman of the Michigan Republican Party
 Ronna Romney, conservative radio talk show host

Campaign
The Republican primary campaign amicably divided the Romney family. Though Ronna Romney had divorced Scott Romney two years prior, Scott's brother Mitt Romney (also a candidate for the United States Senate in Massachusetts) returned to Michigan to campaign for her. Scott and Mitt's father George W. Romney, the former Governor of Michigan, endorsed Abraham, having promised Abraham the endorsement prior to her candidacy. Her daughter, the future Chairman of the Republican National Committee Ronna Romney McDaniel, volunteered as a driver during her campaign.

Results

General election

Candidates
 Spencer Abraham, former chairman of the Michigan Republican Party (Republican)
 Bob Carr, U.S. Representative from East Lansing (Democratic)
 Jon Coon (Libertarian)
 William Roundtree (Workers' World)
 Chris Wege (Natural Law)

Results

See also 
 Politics of the United States
 1994 United States Senate elections

References 

1994
Michigan
1994 Michigan elections